Abu Sa'id al-Rustami was a Persian poet of the 10th-century, who wrote in Arabic during the Buyid era.

Most of the information about Abu Sa'id's life and poems is given by the Yatimat al-dahr, an anthology of al-Tha'alibi (died 1038). Abu Sa'id was given the name of "al-Rustami" after an ancestor six generations earlier who was called Rustam. Abu Sa'id's father was a Persian, while his mother was an Arab from the Al Junayd. Abu Sa'id was born and raised in the city of Isfahan, then a hub centre for poetry and literature. During this period, the literary elite of Isfahan was mainly Sunnite and pro-Hanbalite, and preferred to write in Arabic.

Some of Abu Sa'id's poems have been highlighted by modern historians. Both Ignaz Goldziher and David A. Wacks consider a particular poem of his to have been shu'ubiyya in nature, i.e. promoting superiority over non-Arabs. The poem in question is the following;

Goldziher states that this poem was part of the "last tones of Persian complaints against the Arabs." However, Mohammad Ali Lesani Fesharaki believes there is not enough evidence to support this claim, and considers the poem to simply be a boast about being Persian.

According to Victor Danner, al-Rustami "seems to incarnate the question of cultural affinity."

References

Sources 
 
 
 
 
 

Year of birth unknown
Year of death unknown
Writers from Isfahan
10th-century Iranian people
Buyid-period poets